The New York Sporting Whip was a 19th-century New York City newspaper. It was one of several penny or flash publications popular at the time.

References
Cook, James W. (October 1, 2003). "Dancing across the Color Line", Part III. Common-place, Vol. 4, No. 1. Accessed November 3, 2006.

New York Sporting Whip, The